In August 1928 the Collins street Baptist Church (built 1852) was demolished to make way for a nine-storey building, at 203 Little Collins Street, midway between Swanston and Russell streets.

The land was owned by the Baptist church, and leased to Victoria Palace Ltd., who constructed the building. They left the ground and mezzanine floors to the church, and contributed £5,000 of the estimated £11,000 required to fit it out as a public hall and recreational facilities. Designed to seat 350 persons, it was envisaged that the hall would be used by the church for concerts, meetings, and lectures, and for screening films.
The remainder of the building was to be used by Victoria Palace Ltd. as hotel-style accommodation.

The Central Hall, occupying much of its ground floor, was officially opened on 4 October 1928. Small businesses occupied part of the Little Collins Street frontage, and entrance to the Hall was next to the Victoria Coffee Palace, c. 211–219 Little Collins Street (also on Church grounds).

Examples of use
The range of uses for the hall was wide:
Francis Birtles' docudrama of Aboriginal life Coorab in the Island of Ghosts, introduced by Eldred Pottinger.
Films King of Kings paired with A. Brandon-Cremer's Nursery Rhymes 
Demonstrations of Physical Culture by Aaron Beattie's pupils.
Old-time minstrels and gleesingers' concert, sponsored by radio station 3DB.
Self-improvement lectures by Elsie Lincoln Benedict
Extra-ordinary general meeting of Hoyts Theatres Ltd. (re amalgamation with Fox Film Corp.)
Professional artists' concerts (patrons: Sir John Grice, Sir William Brunton and Sir John Monash) directed by J. Alexander Browne, baritone.
Noël Coward's Hay Fever, presented by the (amateur) Proscenium Players
Community singing
Annual meeting of the Country Women's Association

References 

1928 establishments in Australia
Buildings and structures completed in 1928
Buildings and structures in Melbourne City Centre